The African Handball Confederation (acronym CAHB, referring to ) is the administrative and controlling body for African team handball. Founded on 15 January 1973 after the 2nd All-Africa Games in Lagos (Nigeria), it represents the national handball associations of Africa under the supervision of the International Handball Federation (IHF).

The CAHB headquarters is located in Abidjan, Ivory Coast. Its current president is Dr. Mansourou Aremou from Benin. The motto of the organisation is Let's build African Handball together.

History
The African Handball Confederation has been first continental confederation and with its 53 national federation. It is also the continental confederation with highest numbers of members within the IHF.

The founding congress took place on January 15, 1973, in Lagos, Nigeria during the 2nd All-Africa Games. It was attended by Alberto de San Roman (Spain), the Vice-President of the International Handball Federation. The committee, which had done all the preparation work, was awarded with executive functions within the confederation. Dr. Salem Nabil became President and Babacar Fall Secretary General.

Its headquarters is in Abidjan, Ivory Coast.

CAHB Presidents

CAHB Secretary Generals

CAHB Executive Committee

CAHB Council

CAHB Tournaments

Nations
African Men's Handball Championship
African Women's Handball Championship
African Men's Junior Handball Championship
African Women's Junior Handball Championship
African Men's Youth Handball Championship
African Women's Youth Handball Championship
African Games

Clubs
 African Handball Champions League
 African Handball Cup Winners' Cup
 African Handball Super Cup
 African Women's Handball Champions League
 African Women's Handball Cup Winners' Cup
 African Women's Handball Super Cup

Title Holders

Nations

Clubs

CAHB Members

Zone 1

  Algeria
  Libya
  Morocco
  Tunisia

Zone 2

  Cape Verde
  Gambia
  Guinea
  Guinea Bissau
  Mali
  Mauritania
  Senegal
  Sierra Leone

Zone 3

  Benin
  Burkina Faso
  Ghana
  Ivory Coast
  Liberia
  Niger
  Nigeria
  Togo

Zone 4

  Cameroon
  Central African Republic
  Chad
  Congo
  DR Congo
  Equatorial Guinea ✝
  Gabon
  São Tomé and Príncipe

Zone 5

  Burundi
  Djibouti
  Egypt
  Ethiopia
  Kenya
  Rwanda
  Somalia
  South Sudan
  Sudan
  Tanzania
  Uganda

Zone 6

  Angola
  Botswana
  Eswatini
  Lesotho
  Malawi
  Mozambique
  Namibia ✝
  South Africa
  Zambia
  Zimbabwe

Zone 7

  Comoros
  Madagascar
  Mauritius
  Seychelles

 ✝ means non-active member

Summer olympics record

World Championship record

Sponsors
 Qatar Airways

External links
CAHB official website

 
National members of the International Handball Federation
+Africa
Handball
Sports organizations established in 1973